Alessandro del Caccia (died 1649) was a Roman Catholic prelate who served as Bishop of Pistoia (1600–1649).

Biography
On 3 Jul 1600, he was appointed during the papacy of Pope Clement VIII as Bishop of Pistoia. 
On 9 Jul 1600, he was consecrated bishop by Alessandro Ottaviano de' Medici, Archbishop of Florence, with Bernardo del Nero, Bishop of Bisignano, and Andrea Sorbolonghi, Bishop of Gubbio, serving as co-consecrators. 
He served as Bishop of Pistoia until his death on 4 Sep 1649.

Episcopal succession
While bishop, he was the principal co-consecrator of:  
Cosmas Minerbetti, Bishop of Cortona (1622);
Basile Cacace, Auxiliary Bishop of Ravenna and Titular Archbishop of Ephesus (1624);
Francesco Nori, Bishop of San Miniato (1624); and
Giovanni della Robbia, Bishop of Bertinoro (1624).

References

External links and additional sources
 (for Chronology of Bishops) 
 (for Chronology of Bishops) 

17th-century Italian Roman Catholic bishops
Bishops appointed by Pope Clement VIII
1649 deaths